The term System-specific Impulse, Issp is a measure that describes performance of jet propulsion systems.  A reference number is introduced, which defines the total impulse, Itot, delivered by the system, divided by the system mass, mPS:

Issp=Itot/mPS
Because of the resulting dimension, - delivered impulse per kilogram of system mass mPS, this number is called ‘System-specific Impulse’. In SI units, impulse is measured in newton-seconds (N·s) and Issp in N·s/kg.

The Issp allows a more accurate determination of the propulsive performance of jet propulsion systems than the commonly used Specific Impulse, Isp, which only takes into account the propellant and the thrust engine performance characteristics. Therefore, the Issp permits an objective and comparative performance evaluation of systems of different designs and with different propellants.

The Issp can be derived directly from actual jet propulsion systems by determining the total impulse delivered by the mass of contained propellant, divided by the known total (wet) mass of the propulsion system. This allows a quantitative comparison of for example, built systems.

In addition, the Issp can be derived analytically, for example for spacecraft propulsion systems, in order to facilitate a preliminary selection of systems (chemical, electrical) for spacecraft missions of given impulse and velocity-increment requirements.  A more detailed presentation of derived mathematical formulas for Issp and their applications for spacecraft propulsion are given in the cited references. In 2019 Koppel and others used ISSP as a criterion in selection of electric thrusters.

See also
Specific Impulse

References

Spacecraft propulsion
Physical quantities
Classical mechanics